Phytoecia virgula is a species of beetle from the subfamily Lamiinae.

Description
They can be found from April to July.

Distribution
From Europe, Turkey and Russia to the Caucasus, the Middle East and Kazakhstan.

Development
The life cycle lasts a year. They feed on a wide variety of plants and grasses, including Achillea millefolium, wormwood (Artemisia), carrot (Daucus), tansy (Tanacetum), Inula and hawkweed (Hieracium).

References

virgula
Beetles described in 1825
Beetles of Europe
Taxa named by Toussaint de Charpentier